"I Got a Love" is the first single from Pete Rock & CL Smooth's second album, The Main Ingredient, released in 1994. The song is a horn and guitar-driven love-jam, which sees CL exploring his "ladies man" persona which he first introduced on "Lots of Lovin'". It samples "Ain't Got the Love (Of One Girl on My Mind)" by The Ambassadors. The B-Side is the title track from The Main Ingredient. The single also contains a downtempo remix of "I Got A Love".

Track listing 
Side A
1. I Got A Love (LP Version) (4:57)
2. I Got A Love (Remix) (5:02)
3. I Got A Love (Instrumental) (4:56)
Side B
4. The Main Ingredient (LP Version) (4:46)
5. The Main Ingredient (Instrumental) (4:45)
6. I Got A Love (Remix Instrumental) (5:01)

Chart performance

Pete Rock songs
1994 singles
1994 songs
Elektra Records singles
Songs written by Pete Rock
Songs written by CL Smooth